Muxupip Municipality (In the Yucatec Maya Language: “buried bread”) is one of the 106 municipalities in the Mexican state of Yucatán containing  of land and located roughly  northeast of the city of Mérida. It is bounded on the north by Motul town, on the south by Cacalchén Municipality and on the east and the west by Yaxkukul Municipality and Tixkokob Municipality.

Geography
The water resources in the municipality is only of underground water known locally as cenotes, as there no surface water sources within its limits. The predominant climate here is of warm sub-humid conditions. Precipitation occurs in the months from May to July and the rainfall is only . The annual average relative humidity is 66% in March and 89% in December.

Wildlife
The flora recorded here consists of mostly deciduous forest, excluding the agricultural land. The fauna consists of birds such as the tzutzuy, quail, and dove,  chachalaca. Mammals found here are opossum, rabbits and bats. Snakes and lizards are the reptiles reported here.

History
During pre-Hispanic times, the town fell within the provinces under the chieftainship of Ceh Pech. According to archival documents in 1579 it was established Encomienda.  After the conquest the area became part of the encomienda system. In 1700, Simón Osorio was the encomendero.

Yucatán declared its independence from the Spanish Crown in 1821 and in 1825, the area was assigned to the Motul Municipality. In 1927 it was designated as its own municipality.

Governance
The municipal president is elected for a three-year term. The present president is Dose Del Carmen Escareno Ake (2012–2015). The town council has four councilpersons, who serve as Secretary and councilors of public works, parks and gardens and public lighting.

The Municipal Council administers the business of the municipality. It is responsible for budgeting and expenditures and producing all required reports for all branches of the municipal administration. Annually it determines educational standards for schools.

The Police Commissioners ensure public order and safety. They are tasked with enforcing regulations, distributing materials and administering rulings of general compliance issued by the council.

Communities
The head of the municipality is Muxupip, Yucatán.  The larger populated areas of the municipality include Catzín, Hacienda Ixim, Sac-Citán, San José Cholul, San José Grande, and San Juan Koop. The significant populations are shown below:

The municipality belongs to the Second Federal Electoral Local District and the Ninth Ward.

Local festivals
Every year from 24 to 27 January is the celebration for the town's patroness, the Virgin of the Assumption. There is also a fiesta held on 25 August in honor of St. James.

Tourist attractions
The notable monuments in the municipality are the Temple of Santiago, the Chapel and the Holy Cross dated to the seventeenth century and the main building of the Hacienda Catzmil.

References

Municipalities of Yucatán